Lepidium pinnatifidum is a species of flowering plant in the mustard family known in English by the common name featherleaf pepperweed.

Distribution
The plant is native to Europe, Central Asia, and the Middle East.

It is known elsewhere as an introduced species, particularly as an invasive species in California.

Description
The inflorescence is a raceme of tiny flowers made up mostly of millimeter-long sepals. There are usually no petals, but there occasionally appears a vestigial white petal.

References

External links
Jepson Manual Treatment
Photo gallery

pinnatifidum
Flora of Central Asia
Flora of Europe
Plants described in 1841